Three referendums were held in Switzerland during 1953. The first was held on 19 April on revising the federal law on postal delivery, and was rejected by 64% of voters. The second and third were held on 6 December on reordering the federal budget and adding a new article 24quater to the federal constitution on water pollution controls. The budget proposal was rejected by 58% of voters, whilst the constitutional amendment was approved by 81% of voters.

Results

April: Federal law on postal delivery

December: Federal budget

December: Constitutional amendment

References

1953 referendums
1953 in Switzerland
Referendums in Switzerland